That's the Truth may refer to:
That's the Truth (album), an album by Paul Brandt
"That's the Truth" (Paul Brandt song), the title track from the above album
"That's the Truth" (McFly song), 2010
That's the Truth (Johnny Cash song), 1984